lebua Hotels & Resorts is Bangkok-based luxury hotels and restaurants company with locations in Thailand, India, and New Zealand.   Founded in 2003 with one restaurant, lebua has recently expanded into the German fine dining market under the leadership of Chief Executive Officer Deepak Ohri.

See also
 List of companies of Thailand

References

External links 
 Official site

Hotel chains in Thailand
Hospitality companies of Thailand
2003 establishments in Thailand
Hospitality companies of Bangkok